Karnataka Bank Limited is an Indian private sector bank based in Mangalore. It is an 'A' Class Scheduled Commercial Bank with a network of 905 branches, 1 extension counter, 900 ATMs, 563 cash recyclers and 560 e-lobbies/mini e-lobbies across 22 states and 2 union territories. It has 8,519 employees and over 11 million customers throughout the country. Its shares are listed on the NSE and BSE. The tagline of the bank is "Your Family Bank Across India."

Karnataka Bank Limited has adopted core banking, internet banking and has established its "MoneyPlant" (885 ATMs, 563 cash recyclers and 546 e-lobbies/mini e-lobbies) system across the country.

History 
Karnataka Bank Limited was incorporated on 18 February 1924, and commenced business on 23 May 1924. Its founders established it at Mangalore, a coastal town in the Dakshina Kannada district of Karnataka. Among the founders, who created the bank to serve the South Canara region, was B. R. Vysaray Achar. K. S. N. Adiga served as the chairman from 1958 to 1979.

In the 1960s Karnataka Bank Limited acquired three smaller banks. In 1960 Karnataka Bank Limited acquired the Sringeri Sharada Bank, which was established in 1942 had four branches. Four years later, Karnataka Bank Limited took over Chitradurga Bank (also known as Chitladurg Bank), which was established in 1868 and was the oldest bank in Mysore State. In 1966, Karnataka Bank Limited took over Bank of Karnataka. Bank of Karnataka was established in 1946 and opened one branch in Belgaum in 1947. At the time of this acquisition, Bank of Karnataka had 13 branches.

In September 2003, the bank shifted its head office from Kodialbail to Kankanady.

In 2021, Karnataka Bank Limited operationalized its wholly owned non-financial subsidiary KBL Services Limited with its registered and head office at Bangalore.

Services 

The branches are available in 22 Indian states and 2 Union Territories. 
In August 2008, the Karnataka Bank Limited introduced Quick Remit, a facility to make money transfers easy for Non-Resident Indians living in Canada, United States, and the UK. The bank also runs a 24-hour Internet banking service called MoneyClick.

Karnataka Bank Limited provides business and personal banking products and services in India. The bank has four areas of business: Treasury, Corporate/Wholesale Banking, Retail Banking, and Other Banking Operations. It accepts savings and current accounts, cash certificates, fixed and cumulative deposits, non-resident rupee accounts, ordinary non-resident accounts, and foreign currency accounts; and offers loan products, such as vehicle, home, education, personal, MSME, mortgage, women entrepreneur, gold, and other loans, as well as loans against property and fixed deposits. The bank also provides debit, credit, gift, deposit only, image, and travel cards; life, general, and health insurance products; investments services; and remittance and other services. In addition, it offers forex services, which include pre and post-shipment, export collection bills, export LC advising, inward remittance facility, import letter of credit, import bill collection, buyer's credit, and outward remittances. Additionally, it offers various loans for agriculture; and other services, such as Internet banking, mutual funds, demat services, locker facility, and funds transfer services.

Digital banking
 KBL Mobile Plus
 KBL mPassbook
 BHIM KBL UPI App
 KBL POS Manager
 KBL MoneyClick Internet Banking

C.E.O & M.D/ Chairman 

 B. R. Vyasaraya Achar (1924-1958)
 K. Suryanarayana Adiga (23 November 1958 – 15 February 1979)
 K. N. Basri (15 February 1979 – 19 February 1980)
 P. Raghuram (16 June 1980 – 15 June 1985)
 P. Sundar Rao (11 September 1985 – 10 September 1989)
 H. M. Rama Rao (11 January 1990 – 11 January 1993)
 U. V. Bhat (28 June 1993 – 27 June 1995)
 M. S. Krishna Bhat (12 July 1995 – 11 July 2000)
 Ananthakrishna (13 July 2000 – 11 July 2009)
 Polali Jayarama Bhat (12 July 2009 – 10 April 2017)
 M. S. Mahabaleshwara (15 April 2017- )

Controversy 
Karnataka Bank reported Rs 285 crore fraud to Reserve Bank of India by DHFL, Religare Finvest, Fedders Electric and Engineering Ltd and Leel Electricals Ltd.

One of the Branches of Karnataka Bank is involved in the locker theft case.

See also

 Banking in India
 Indian Financial System Code

References 

Banks based in Karnataka
Private sector banks in India
Banks established in 1924
Companies based in Mangalore
Banks established in Mangalore
Indian companies established in 1924
Companies listed on the National Stock Exchange of India
Companies listed on the Bombay Stock Exchange